Conyers is a city in Rockdale County, Georgia, U.S.

Conyers  may also refer to:
Conyers (surname)
Conyers (given name)
Baron Conyers, a peerage in the English peerage, created 1509
Conyers baronets, an English baronetcy (1628–1810), including a list of baronets

See also
Conyer, a hamlet in Swale, Kent, England
Conyers Dill & Pearman, an international law firm
Conyers Farm, in Greenwich, Connecticut, U.S.
Conyer's Green, Suffolk, a village in Suffolk, England
Conyers' School, a secondary school in Yarm, England
Hutton Conyers, a village in North Yorkshire, England
Yealand Conyers, a village in Lancashire, England